Yuezhou may refer to:

Yuezhou Town, a town in Qilin District, Qujing, Yunnan, China

Historical prefectures
Yue Prefecture (Hunan) (岳州), a prefecture between the 6th and 20th centuries in modern Hunan, China
Yue Prefecture (Zhejiang) (越州), a prefecture between the 7th and 12th centuries in modern Zhejiang, China

See also
Yue (disambiguation)